Fosdagrocorat (developmental code names PF-04171327 and PF-4171327; also known as dagrocorat 2-(dihydrogen phosphate)) is a nonsteroidal but steroid-like selective glucocorticoid receptor modulator (SGRM) which was under development for the treatment of rheumatoid arthritis but was never marketed. It is the C2 dihydrogen phosphate ester of dagrocorat, and acts as a prodrug of dagrocorat with improved pharmacokinetics. The drug reached phase II clinical trials prior to the discontinuation of its development.

See also
 AZD-5423
 Mapracorat
 Dagrocorat

References

External links
 Fosdagrocorat - AdisInsight

Anti-inflammatory agents
Carboxamides
Glucocorticoids
Phenanthrenes
Phenyl compounds
Phosphate esters
Prodrugs
Pyridines
Selective glucocorticoid receptor modulators
Trifluoromethyl compounds